The Afro-Bolivian Royal House is a ceremonial monarchy recognized as part of the Plurinational State of Bolivia, which does not interfere with the system of the Presidential republic in force within the country. It is centred in Mururata, a village in the Yungas region of Bolivia. The monarchy is treated as a customary leader of the Afro-Bolivian community.

The powers of the Afro-Bolivian king are similar to those of a traditional king, representing the Afro-Bolivian community.

History

The components of this royal house are the descendants of an old African tribal monarchy that were brought to Bolivia as slaves. The founding monarch, Uchicho, was allegedly of Kongo and Senegalese origin, and was brought to the Hacienda of the Marquis de Pinedo, in the area of Los Yungas in what is now La Paz Department. Other slaves allegedly recognized him as a man of regal background (a prince from the ancient Kingdom of Kongo) when seeing his torso exposed with royal tribal marks only held by royalty. He was crowned in 1823, and was succeeded by Bonifaz, who adopted the surname of Pinedo, the plantation owner. Bonifaz was succeeded by Don José and Don Bonifacio, the latter of whom was born in 1880 crowned in 1932. When Bonifacio died in 1954, the house was led by his oldest daughter Doña Aurora. Because of the lack of a male heir, the kingdom was left without a king for 38 years. Aurora's oldest son, Julio Pinedo, was given the title of king in 1992. 

The Royal House was officially recognized by the Bolivian state in 2007 with the public coronation of Julio, the current King of the Afro-Bolivian community, which was done by the authorities of the La Paz Department.

King Julio has a son, Prince Rolando, who was born in 1995. By 2021 he was studying law at the Universidad de Los Andes in La Paz and preparing for his prospective role as king, stating that his ambitions were to "keep pushing forward to make the Afro-Bolivian community more recognised and visible, the way my father has done until now".

References 

Afro-Bolivian
La Paz Department (Bolivia)
Monarchies of South America
Bolivia
Kongolese royalty
Non-sovereign monarchy